Matanas enrighti is an extinct duck from the Miocene of New Zealand. It was described from fossil material (a left humerus) collected from a Saint Bathans Fauna site near Mata Creek, in the lower Bannockburn Formation of the Manuherikia Group, in the Manuherikia River valley in the Central Otago region of the South Island.

Name
The genus name is a combination of the name of Mata Creek with anas (“duck”). The specific epithet honours Jack Enright, owner of the station on which the type material was collected.

References

External links

Fossil taxa described in 2007
Birds described in 2007
Anatinae
Miocene birds
Extinct birds of New Zealand
Extinct monotypic bird genera